Nawaf Al-Shenashini (born 3 January 1999) is a Saudi Arabian professional footballer who plays as a forward for Al-Nairyah.

Career
Al-Shenashini started his career at Al-Nassr and is a product of the Al-Nassr's youth system. On 4 May 2017, Al-Shenashini made his professional debut for Al-Nassr against Al-Hilal in the Pro League, replacing Shaye Ali Sharahili . On 17 January 2019, Al-Shenashini left Al-Nassr and signed MS League side Al-Ansar. On 1 October 2019, Al-Shenashini left Al-Ansar and signed Saudi Third Division side Al-Nairyah.</ref>

Career statistics

Club

References

External links
 

1996 births
Living people
Saudi Arabian footballers
Al Nassr FC players
Al-Ansar FC (Medina) players
Al-Nairyah Club players
Saudi Professional League players
Saudi First Division League players
Saudi Second Division players
Saudi Fourth Division players
Association football forwards